David Richmond (1748–1818) was an American commissioned officer who served in the American Revolutionary War.

Early years
Richmond, the son of Mayflower descendant Seth Richmond, was born in Taunton, Massachusetts. He married Nancy Davis in 1766.

Richmond had five sons: Joseph, David, Thomas, Samuel and Seth; and four daughters: Lucy, Esther, Lydia and Nancy.

American Revolutionary War Record
From May 1, 1775, to October 1775, Richmond was a lieutenant in Captain John Field's Company, Colonel Daniel Hitchcock's Regiment.

By December 1776, Richmond was a first lieutenant in Captain Timothy Vilmarth's Company, Colonel Chad Brown's Regiment. He was appointed captain on September 30, 1778.

In the summer of 1780, Richmond served one month as a major.

Post war
Major Richmond moved from Rhode Island and settled at Latham's Corners, Chenango County, New York.

References

1748 births
1818 deaths
Rhode Island militiamen in the American Revolution
People from Taunton, Massachusetts
People of colonial Massachusetts
Continental Army officers from Massachusetts